Dündar Bey (conventionally called Falakuddin Dündar bin Ilyas bin Hamit) was the founder of Hamidoğlu Beylik, an Anatolian beylik in the 14th century. (Anatolia is the Asiatic part of Turkey). His father was İlyas Bey.

In the 13th century, Seljuks of Anatolia settled Hamit Bey's Turkoman tribe in the newly conquered territory in southwest Anatolia around Uluborlu. But after Seljuks were defeated by the Mongols in 1243, eventually like all other Turkmen tribes Hamit's tribe became semi independent under Mongol Ilkhanate suzerainty. Hamit's grandson Dündar conquered Antalya port and appointed his brother Yunus as the governor of the city. Over confident of himself, he declared independence and assumed the title sultan in 1316. However, Timurtash the high commander of Mongols in Anatolia marched to Eğirdir, Dündar's capital and Dündar fled to Antalya. But Mahmud the governor of the city who was Dündar's nephew allied himself with the Mongols and arrested him. He was executed by the Mongols in 1324. Timurtash temporarily annexed the territory around Eğridir but Mahmut kept his possessions. On the other hand, after Timurtash himself took refuge in Egypt, Dündar's sons were able to continue their father's beylik (without the southern lands around Antalya which were issued from the main beylik and called Teke Beylik after 1327).

Family
He had three sons. Hızır Bey, Ishak Bey and Mehmet Bey.

References

History of Isparta Province
1324 deaths
Anatolian beyliks
States and territories established in 1316
Year of birth unknown
14th-century monarchs in Asia